Aleksis Tsänk (12 August 1908 Meremäe Parish, Võru County – 20 April 1942 Sevurallag, Sverdlovsk Oblast) was an Estonian politician. He was a member of VI Riigikogu (its Chamber of Deputies).

References

1908 births
1942 deaths
Members of the Riigivolikogu